Bashir Haider (born 30 December 1940) is a former Pakistani cricketer. A fast-medium bowler for the Pakistan Railways team, he played first-class cricket from 1960 to 1971.

Haider was one of the fastest bowlers in Pakistan in his time, but was inaccurate. He captained Pakistan Railways in the Ayub Trophy in 1964–65 when they inflicted the heaviest defeat in first-class cricket history: by an innings and 851 runs over Dera Ismail Khan. His best first-class figures were 5 for 76 against Lahore in the Quaid-e-Azam Trophy in 1968–69.

His grandson Ahmed Bashir is also a first-class cricketer in Pakistan.

References

External links
 

1940 births
Living people
Pakistani cricketers
Pakistan Railways cricketers
Cricketers from Sheikhupura